Mawlana Qiamuddin Khadim(1901 - 1979, Afghanistan, Kabul) was a renowned Afghan scholar, poet, writer, journalist, public speaker and one of the founding member of the first political party of Afghanistan, Weekh Zalmian (the vigilant youth). His scholastic achievements, political contribution and dedication to the Afghan national cause earned him the title Mawlana. He was also a senator in the era of King Mohammad Zahir Shah. He was the author and publisher of hundreds of Afghan books and articles.

Books by Qiamuddin Khadim 
 د کوچنيانو اخلاقي پالنه Ethical education of children
 نوی ژوندون New Life
 پښتونولي Pakhtunwali
 د شريف سرگذشت Sharif's fate
 د ملغلرو امېل Necklace of pearls
 بايزيد روښان Bayazid Rokhan
 مکارم اخلاق High Ethics
 خيالي دنيا Fantasy World
 نبوغ او عبقريت Intelligence and Genius
 نوې رڼا New light
 اوسني پښتانه لیکوالان Contemporary Afghan Writers
 لوی اصحابان Great Companions
 کاروان Caravan
 د نثر او نثاراو تذکره Prose and Prose writers' biography
 پښتو کلي، دويم جلد  Pakhto Kele, second volume
 د معلم پښتو يوه برخه Pashto Teacher's co-writer
 پښتانه شعرا ، لومړۍ لويه برخه Afghan Poets co-writer
 د مولانا جامي د کافۍ شرحه Description of Mawlana Jami's Kafi
 د خوشحال او رحمان موازنه The comparison of Khushal & Rahman
 افغاني تهذيب او تمدن Afghan customary and civilization
 د خوشحال خان پر دستار نامه شرحه The Description of Khushal Khan's Dastarnama
 د تاريخ يوه سره پاڼه A red page of History
 د پارتيانو حکومت The rule of Parthia
 د کوشانيانو حکومت The rule of Kushans
 علمي پښتونولي Scientific Pashtunwali
 د روښانيانو مبارزې The struggles of The Rokhanians
 پر تذکرة الاوليا تبصره A commentary on Tazkiratulawliya
 د بابا نصيحت The Advice of Baba
 سيد کمال او بوبو جانه Sayed Kamal & Bobo jan
 غلجي په تاريخ کې Ghilji in the course of history
 د مور حماسه Enthusiasm of Mother
 لرغونې پښتانه قومونه Ancient Afghan Tribes
 ټولنپال افغان مونوفېسټ Social Afghan Mono fest 
 نصوص الحکم Provisions of Governance
 د مور مينه Mother's love
 بلکا Balka
 پښتون او پښتونولي Pakhtun & Pakhtunwali
 زما د ژوند کيسه The story of my life
 زريادريس او اوداتيس کيسه The story of Zaryadis & Odatis
 کره پښتو گرامر Concise Pashto Grammar
 نوې لار The New path
 مکالمات Conversation
 غريزه حب الخير Instinct Philanthropy

Sources 

Afghan writers
20th-century Afghan historians
1901 births
1979 deaths